Instituto Costarricense de Electricidad (ICE) is the Costa Rican government-run electricity and telecommunications services provider. Together with the Radiographic Costarricense SA (RACSA) and Compañía Nacional de Fuerza y Luz (CNFL), they form the ICE Group.

ICE was founded on 8 April 1949 by Decree-Law No. 449, after the Costa Rican Civil War of 1948, in order to solve the problems of power shortages that occurred in Costa Rica in the 1940s. Since 1963, ICE provides telecommunications services throughout the country.

The attempts to reform ICE throughout a set of laws in the years 1999 and 2000 generated a great social mobilization, including the 2000 Costa Rican protests. The ruling party at that time, the Social Christian Unity Party, and the main opposition, National Liberation Party, agreed to change the institution. Meanwhile, the citizen opposition reached 274 protests in 14 days.

Following the Dominican Republic–Central America Free Trade Agreement, the telecommunication market was opened to private companies. Since 2011, América Móvil through Claro Americas and Telefónica through Movistar, are competing against ICE in the Costa Rican mobile market.

In 2021, ICE Group generated an annual operating income of around $2.194 billion.

References

External links

 (in Spanish)

Telecommunications companies established in 1949
Electric power companies of Costa Rica
Telecommunications companies of Costa Rica
Public utilities established in 1949
1949 establishments in Costa Rica